is a Japanese boy band formed through the reality competition show Produce 101 Japan 2. The group is composed of eleven members: Masaya Kimura, Hiromu Takatsuka, Shogo Tajima, Kyosuke Fujimaki, Takumi Ozaki, Hiroto Nishi, Jin Matsuda, Xu Fengfan, Rihito Ikezaki, Yudai Sano and Takeru Goto. Like the winners of the first season of Produce 101 Japan, INI is intended to be a permanent group. The group is managed by Lapone Entertainment, a joint company between Yoshimoto Kogyo and CJ ENM.

Name
The group's name, INI, was chosen by Lapone Entertainment among all the suggestions given by the viewers through Produce 101 Japan's official website. The name was announced during the final episode of the show.

The official meaning of the name is "the 11 of us (me:I) who met on PRODUCE 101 JAPAN SEASON2 connect (Network) with you (I)".

Members

Discography

Albums

Singles

Promotional singles

Awards and nominations

References

External links 
 official website (in Japanese)

2021 establishments in Japan
Japanese boy bands
Japanese dance music groups
Japanese idol groups
Japanese pop music groups
Musical groups established in 2021
Produce 101
Produce 101 contestants
Singing talent show winners